Lois Geary (July 25, 1929 – June 28, 2014) was an American actress of the stage and screen.

Geary was born in Fort Wayne, Indiana and moved to Santa Fe, New Mexico in the 1960s. She often worked in the area's scene, but would land small roles in films like The Astronaut Farmer, Silverado, Sunshine Cleaning and The Last Stand.

Geary died on June 28, 2014, at the age of 84.

Filmography

References

External links 

1929 births
2014 deaths
Actors from Fort Wayne, Indiana
American stage actresses
Actors from Santa Fe, New Mexico
21st-century American women